Sinanju is a fictional Korean martial art (the "Sun Source" of all martial arts) of the cult paperback book series The Destroyer, by Warren Murphy and Richard Sapir. The Destroyer series lampoons politicians, politics, and other adventure novels, and features gory violence on evildoers, martial art adventures and more.

Background
After a faked execution, the protagonist, ex-cop Remo Williams, is recruited by a secret U.S. organization, CURE, for missions that must be handled covertly outside the boundaries of other U.S. organizations.  Remo is taught Sinanju by Chiun, the reigning Master of Sinanju, who, besides being the world's greatest assassin, acts as a mentor, nutritionist, and linguist, and is a soap opera fan.  Remo is also believed to be the incarnation of Shiva "the destroyer" whose mission is to destroy evil.

History of Sinanju
Chiun comes from a long line of hired assassins called the House of Sinanju that has pursued its trade since before the time of the pharaohs. (Chiun explains that Tutankhamun was killed by a Sinanju master after attempting to defraud the House by reneging on a contract.)  Sinanju is a village on the coast of North Korea; the Korean translation is, literally, "comfortable new village". Historically, revenues from the House's contracts have been used to support the inhabitants. Early disciples of the art used weapons, but the later practitioners developed virtually superhuman abilities through the training as it became revised following the ascension of Master Wang, the greatest master of the art up until modern times. Sinanju training enables one to hold one's breath for over an hour, rip steel doors from their hinges, climb walls, dodge bullets (even at point-blank range), overturn a moving tank, outrun a car, seem invisible, overcome multiple opponents, and bring a woman to the heights of sexual ecstasy.

According to Chiun, the other martial arts in the world (kung fu, ninjutsu, etc.) are all seriously diluted imitations of Sinanju. He compares the other arts to rays of sunshine with Sinanju being the sun itself. He also refers to an ancient Sinanju legend which predicts that the greatest master in the history of the art will be a dead white Night Tiger (Sinanju acolyte) "made whole by the art." Remo appears to fit the description in Chiun's estimation.

Shadows of Sinanju
There are other groups that practice diluted forms of Sinanju. These include:
 The Wa: A line of assassins that was taught by an ancient master of Sinanju how to use knives effectively. They tried to betray the village of Sinanju to its enemies and were forced to flee to Japan, where they operated until the 20th century.
 The Wissex: An English house of assassins that were created after a master of Sinanju received a retainer to train an auxiliary assassin from the court of Henry the Eighth to serve in his absence. This group was trained in poisons and other arts that the House of Sinanju had abandoned following the ascension of Master Wang.
 The Sun On Jo: An American Indian tribe founded by a Master of Sinanju named Kojong who journeyed to America centuries earlier. He taught his descendant how to fight, walk silently across sand without disturbing it and other tricks, but imposed a decree on them that they must not take human life — this was done so the main house would not face future competitors. He also passed on the Sinanju-derived abilities to his eldest son, whose own firstborn sons would be called by the name "Sunny Joe". Remo Williams' father Bill Roam is a member of this tribe and a direct descendant of Kojong, confirming what Chiun had long suspected about Remo's Korean heritage. Remo's son and daughter (Stone Smith and Freya Williams) are being taught Sinanju by Bill Roam in the "Legacy" series, co-authored by Gerald Welch and Warren Murphy until Murphy's death in 2015. Welch continues the series.

References

External links
WarrenMurphy.com - Series Co-Creator and Co-Author
JamesMullaney.com - James Mullaney, co-author of The New Destroyer series
Sinanju.com - Book series site
TheNewDestroyer.com - New Book series site
Sinanju.net - Destroyer Fan Site

Fictional martial arts
Korea in fiction